The Tanger is a small river of Saxony-Anhalt, Germany. It is a left tributary to the river Elbe at Tangermünde.

See also
List of rivers of Saxony-Anhalt

Rivers of Saxony-Anhalt
Rivers of Germany